Susan Gass (born 1943) is an American Kenneth W. Mildenberger Prize-winner linguist. She is currently a professor emerita, retired from the Department of Linguistics, Languages, and Cultures at Michigan State University. Her research focuses on applied linguistics with a special focus on second language learning, corrective feedback, and task-based language learning. She graduated in 1961 from Kingswood School Cranbrook.

Career 
Gass served as the Director of the English Language Center, Co-Director of the Center for Language Education And Research, co-Director of the Center for Language Teaching Advancement and Director of the Second Language Studies Ph.D. Program at the Michigan State University.

Between 2002 and 2008 she served as president of the International Association of Applied Linguistics. 

She is currently the Editor of Studies in Second Language Acquisition.

Research
According to Google Scholar, Gass's most cited publications include: Second language acquisition: An introductory course, Second language research: Methodology and design, and Input, interaction, and the second language learner.

One of her major publications is a journal article, published in Applied Linguistics in 1985, entitled Non-native/Non-native Conversations: A Model for Negotiation of Meaning. The article, co-written with Evangeline Varonis, builds on the research focusing on conversational interactions between native speakers and non-native speakers. The paper focuses on interactions among non-native speakers of English. Varonis and Gass noted that negotiation of meaning was the most common among non-native speaker/non-native speaker pairs.

Publications
Gass has had work published in several major journals such as Applied Linguistics, Studies in Second Language Acquisition, Language Learning, The Modern Language Journal, and AILA Review.

She has co-written books with Larry Selinker, Alison Mackey, Charlene Polio, and Bill VanPatten.

Awards
Gass has received numerous outstanding awards throughout her career.
1995: MSU Outstanding Research Award, Golden Key Honor Society, 1995
1996: Paul Pimsleur Award for Outstanding Research, ACTFL (American Council for the Teaching of Foreign Languages). 
1998: Ralph Smuckler Award for advancing international studies and programs, Michigan State University Michigan Association of Governing Boards Award
2002: Distinguished Scholarship and Service (American Association for Applied Linguistics)
2012: Language Learning Outstanding article (with Luke Plonsky)
2016: Kenneth W. Mildenberger Prize (with Alison Mackey)

Bibliography

Books
Gass, S. M., Madden, C. G., Conference on Applied Linguistics, & University of Michigan. (1985). Input in second language acquisition. Cambridge, Mass: Newbury House.
Gass, S. M., & Selinker, L. (1994). Language transfer in language learning. Amsterdam: John Benjamins.
Gass, S. M., & Mackey, A. (2000). Stimulated recall methodology in second language research. Mahwah, NJ: Lawrence Erlbaum Associates.
Mackey, A., & Gass, S. M. (2005). Second language research: methodology and design. Mahwah, N.J.: Lawrence Erlbaum Associates.
Gass, S. M., & Mackey, A. (2007). Data elicitation for second and foreign language research. Mahwah, N.J.: Lawrence Erlbaum Associates.
Gass, S. M., Mackey, A., & Polio, C. (2011). Multiple perspectives on interaction: Second language research in honor of Susan M. Gass. New York, NY: Routledge.
Gass, S. M., & Mackey, A. (Eds.) (2012). The Routledge handbook of second language acquisition. London: Routledge.
Mackey, A., & Gass, S. M. (Eds.) (2012). Research methods in second language acquisition: a practical guide. Chichester: Wiley Blackwell.
Gass, S. M. (2013). Second Language Acquisition: An Introductory Course. Hoboken: Taylor and Francis.
Gass, S. M., Selinker, L., & Sorace, A. (2013). Second language learning data analysis: Teacher's manual.

Articles
Varonis, E. M., & Gass, S. (1985). Non-native/Non-native Conversations: A Model for Negotiation of Meaning, Applied Linguistics, 6(1), 71–90, doi:

References

External links 
 

1946 births
Living people
Applied linguists
Linguists from the United States
Women linguists
People from Los Angeles
Michigan State University faculty
University of California, Berkeley alumni
Middlebury College alumni
University of California, Los Angeles alumni
Indiana University alumni
Presidents of the International Association of Applied Linguistics
Presidents of the American Association for Applied Linguistics